The 1953 Little League World Series was held from August 25 to August 28 in Williamsport, Pennsylvania. In the championship game, Birmingham, Alabama, beat Schenectady, New York, by a score of 1–0 in the seventh edition of the tournament.

The Birmingham Public Library commemorated the 50th anniversary of the championship in 2003.

Teams

Results

Notable players

References

External links
1953 Tournament Bracket via Wayback Machine
1953 Line Scores via Wayback Machine
 

Little League World Series
Little League World Series
Little League World Series